Jaysh al-Sunna was a Homs-based Islamist rebel group that was established as a merger between different rebel groups, some of which originally came from the Free Syrian Army's Farouq Brigades, and is active during the Syrian Civil War. It joined the Army of Conquest on 24 March 2015, and took part in the Second Battle of Idlib. It lost 14 fighters in the battle.

Alleged bombing by the U.S.-led coalition 
On 11 August 2015, an ammunition depot and base belonging to the group were allegedly bombed by the U.S.-led anti-ISIL coalition in the Atme area in the northern Idlib Governorate. Ten of the group's fighters were killed along with 8 civilians. Robert Ford, the former U.S. ambassador to Syria, expressed consternation at why an airstrike was conducted on Jaysh al-Sunna.

Reported use of child soldiers

In October 2016, it was reported that Jaysh al-Sunna released a video which featured child soldiers at an unidentified training camp. A Saudi cleric named Abdullah al-Muhesini was linked to the child soldier recruitment in northern Aleppo, and has allegedly recruited up to 1,000 children in all of Syria by paying them a $100 monthly salary.

Notable former member groups 
 Battalion 13

See also

List of armed groups in the Syrian Civil War

References

External links

Anti-government factions of the Syrian civil war
2015 establishments in Syria
Tahrir al-Sham
Salafi Islamist groups
Sunni Islamist groups